Battle of Mers-el-Kébir or Mers-el-Kébir expedition may refer to:

 The Battle of Mers-el-Kébir (1501) by Portugal.
 The Capture of Mers-el-Kébir (1505) by Spain.
 The Battle of Mers-el-Kébir (1507), which was an ambush near the city conducted by the Kingdom of Tlemcen.
 The Sieges of Oran and Mers-el-Kébir by Hasan Pasha
 The Capture of Oran (1708) the capture of the city, and it's neighbour (Oran) by the Algerine forces
 The Spanish Conquest of Oran (1732) by Spain
 The Reconquest of Oran and Mers-el-Kébir (1792) by Algeria
 The Conquest of Oran (1831) by French colonial forces
The Attack on Mers-el-Kébir by British forces

History of Algiers